Vyacheslav Mikhailovich Anisin (born 11 July 1951) is a Russian retired professional ice hockey player.

Anisin played in the Soviet Championship League for HC CSKA Moscow, Krylya Sovetov Moscow, SKA Leningrad and HC Spartak Moscow.  He would later play in the Yugoslav Ice Hockey League for KHL Medveščak and in Serie A in Italy for Milano.

He also played for the Soviet team during the 1972 Summit Series against Canada.  He was inducted into the Russian and Soviet Hockey Hall of Fame in 1973.

Personal life
Anisin was born in Moscow, Russia. His son Mikhail Anisin is also an ice hockey player and currently plays for UHC Dynamo of the Kontinental Hockey League. His daughter Marina Anissina is a former European, World and Olympic champion ice dancer who represented France. She retired after winning gold in the 2002 Winter Olympics in Salt Lake City, Utah.

Anisin was a recipient of the Soviet Medal "For Labour Valour".

External links
 
 Russian and Soviet Hockey Hall of Fame bio

1951 births
HC CSKA Moscow players
HC Milano players
HC Spartak Moscow players
KHL Medveščak Zagreb players
Krylya Sovetov Moscow players
Living people
Russian expatriate ice hockey people
SKA Saint Petersburg players
Soviet expatriate ice hockey players
Soviet ice hockey centres
Soviet expatriate sportspeople in Italy
Soviet expatriate sportspeople in Yugoslavia
Ice hockey people from Moscow
Expatriate ice hockey players in Italy
Expatriate ice hockey players in Yugoslavia